In Greek mythology, Geras , also written Gēras, was the god of old age. He was depicted as a tiny, shriveled old man. Gēras's opposite was Hebe, the goddess of youth. His Roman equivalent was Senectus. He is known primarily from vase depictions that show him with the hero Heracles; the mythic story that inspired these depictions has been lost.

Mythology 
According to Hesiod, Geras is one of the many sons and daughters that Nyx produced parthenogenetically. However, both Hyginus and Cicero add Erebus, Nyx's consort, as his father.

In the myth of Tithonus, the mortal prince received immortality, but not agelessness, from the gods so when old age came to him he kept aging and shrinking but never dying. In the end Eos turned Tithonus into a cicada. In several ancient Greek vases Geras is depicted fighting Heracles, although no relevant written myth survives. Geras is presented as an old, wrinkled bald man begging for mercy.

Philostratus claimed that the people of Gadeira set up altars to Geras and Thanatos.

Function 
Geras as embodied in humans represented a virtue: the more gēras a man acquired, the more kleos (fame) and arete (excellence and courage) he was considered to have. In ancient Greek literature, the related word géras (γέρας) can also carry the meaning of influence, authority or power; especially that derived from fame, good looks and strength claimed through success in battle or contest. Such uses of this meaning can be found in Homer's Odyssey, throughout which there is an evident concern from the various kings about the géras they will pass to their sons through their names. The concern is significant because kings at this time (such as Odysseus) are believed to have ruled by common assent in recognition of their powerful influence, rather than hereditarily.  The Greek word γῆρας (gĕras) means "old age" or in some other literature "dead skin" or "slough of a snake"; this word is the root of English words such as "geriatric".

See also 

 Cumaean Sibyl
 Elli, Norse personification of old age
 Gerascophobia

Notes

References 
 Gaius Julius Hyginus, Fabulae from The Myths of Hyginus translated and edited by Mary Grant. University of Kansas Publications in Humanistic Studies. Online version at the Topos Text Project.
 Hesiod, Theogony from The Homeric Hymns and Homerica with an English Translation by Hugh G. Evelyn-White, Cambridge, MA.,Harvard University Press; London, William Heinemann Ltd. 1914. Online version at the Perseus Digital Library. Greek text available from the same website.
 Marcus Tullius Cicero, Nature of the Gods from the Treatises of M.T. Cicero translated by Charles Duke Yonge (1812-1891), Bohn edition of 1878. Online version at the Topos Text Project.
 Marcus Tullius Cicero, De Natura Deorum. O. Plasberg. Leipzig. Teubner. 1917.  Latin text available at the Perseus Digital Library.

Greek gods
Time and fate gods
Personifications in Greek mythology
Children of Nyx
Old age
Mythology of Heracles